David Gauntlett (born 15 March 1971) is a British sociologist and media theorist, and the author of several books including Making is Connecting.

His earlier work concerned contemporary media audiences, and has moved towards a focus on the everyday making and sharing of digital media and social media and the role of these activities in self-identity and building creative cultures.

Career
Gauntlett graduated from the University of York in Sociology in 1992. He completed an MA in Women's Studies at Lancaster University then took his PhD and then taught at the University of Leeds from 1993 to 2002, then was appointed Professor of Media and Audiences at Bournemouth University. In 2006 he joined the School of Media, Arts and Design at University of Westminster as Professor of Media and Communications, becoming Co-Director of the Communications and Media Research Institute (CAMRI), from 2010-2015. From 2015-2017 he was Professor of Creativity and Design, and the Director of Research for Westminster School of Media, Arts and Design.

In 2018, he took up a role as a Canada Research Chair in the Faculty of Communication and Design at Ryerson University, Toronto.

Gauntlett's critique of media 'effects' studies sparked controversy in 1995, and since then he has published a number of books and research on the role of popular media in people's lives. In particular he has focused on the way in which digital media is changing the experience of media in general.

In 2007, he was shortlisted for the 'Young Academic Author of the Year' award in the Times Higher awards.

In the 2008 book, Reading Media Theory, Barlow & Mills state: "David Gauntlett is a prominent, public academic, who has spent his career engaging in research activities which have deliberately involved the public, and have crossed the traditional divide between the academic community and the outside world."

New creative research methods
This approach asks participants to make something as part of the research process. Gauntlett's work of this kind began with Video Critical (1997), in which children were asked to make videos about the environment, and then in a number of projects which are discussed in Creative Explorations (2007). As well as studies in which participants have been invited to make video, diaries, collage, and drawings, Gauntlett has explored the use of Lego Serious Play as a tool in sociology and social research. This approach makes use of metaphor and invites participants to build metaphorical models of their identities. The process of making something, and then reflecting upon it, aims to give a more nuanced insight into participants' feelings or experiences.

This work has been supported by awards from the Arts and Humanities Research Council.

Media Studies 2.0
In 2007, Gauntlett published online the article Media Studies 2.0, which created some discussion amongst media studies educators. The article argues that the traditional form of media studies teaching and research fails to recognise the changing media landscape in which the categories of 'audiences' and 'producers' blur together, and in which new research methods and approaches are needed. Andy Ruddock has written that Gauntlett's "ironic polemic" includes "much to value", and acknowledges that the argument "is more strategy than creed", but argues that audiences still exist, and experience mass media specifically as audience, and so it would be premature to dispose of the notion of 'audience' altogether. In other areas there has been less acceptance: Andy Medhurst at Sussex University wrote of Media Studies 2.0, 'Isn't it odd that whenever someone purportedly identifies a new paradigm, they see themselves as already a leading practitioner of it?'

Making is Connecting
In 2008 Gauntlett proposed 'the Make and Connect Agenda', an attempt to rethink audience studies in the context of media users as producers as well as consumers of media material. This argues that there is a shift from a 'sit-back-and-be-told culture' to a 'making-and-doing culture', and that harnessing creativity in both Web 2.0 and in other everyday creative activities will play a role in tackling environmental problems.

These ideas are developed further in his best-known book 'Making is Connecting: The social meaning of creativity, from DIY and knitting to YouTube and Web 2.0'.

The Second Edition of 'Making is Connecting' was published in 2018, and included additional sections on the creative process.

Books
 Making is Connecting: Second Expanded Edition (Polity, 2018).
 Making Media Studies: The Creativity Turn in Media and Communications Studies (Peter Lang, 2015).
 Making is Connecting: The social meaning of creativity, from DIY and knitting to YouTube and Web 2.0 (Polity, 2011).
 Media Studies 2.0, and Other Battles around the Future of Media Research (Kindle, 2011).
 Creative Explorations: New approaches to identities and audiences (London: Routledge, 2007).
 Media, Gender and Identity (Routledge, 2002; second edition, 2008).
 Web.Studies (edited collection, Arnold & Oxford Univ Press, 2000; second edition, co-edited with Ross Horsley, 2004).
 TV Living: Television, Culture and Everyday Life (Routledge, 1999). Written with Annette Hill.
 Video Critical: Children, The Environment and Media Power (John Libbey, 1997).
 Moving Experiences (John Libbey, 1995; second edition, 2005).

References

External links
 Official Website 
 Making is Connecting – site about Making is Connecting project, with extracts, video, etc.
 Interview with David Gauntlett – Interview from 2010 book Mashup Cultures

1971 births
Living people
Mass media theorists
British sociologists
Academics of the University of Leeds
Academics of the University of Westminster
Alumni of the University of Leeds
Alumni of the University of York